Custer, also known as The Legend of Custer, is a 17-episode military-western television series which ran on ABC from September 6 to December 27, 1967, with Wayne Maunder in the starring role of then Lieutenant Colonel George Armstrong Custer. Criticizing the series as "glamorizing Custer," a concerted protest headed by the Tribal Indians Land Rights Association successfully halted broadcast of the series under the FCC fairness doctrine.

Format

Robert F. Simon played Custer's commanding officer, U.S. General Alfred H. Terry. Slim Pickens starred as California Joe Milner. Michael Dante appeared as Sioux Chief Crazy Horse. Peter Palmer played Sergeant James Bustard, a former Confederate soldier. Grant Woods appeared as Captain Myles Keogh. Read Morgan appeared in the episode "Spirit Woman" in the role of a medicine man.

Guest stars included Lloyd Bochner (as James Stanhope), Rory Calhoun (as Zebediah Jackson), Philip Carey (as Benton Conant), James Daly (as John Rudford), Alexander Davion (as Capt. Marcus A. Reno), Burr DeBenning (as Uvalde), Yvonne De Carlo (as Vanessa Ravenhill), Gene Evans (as Deedricks), Arthur Franz (as Grey Fox and Bledsoe), Billy Gray (as Billy Nixon), Barbara Hale (as Melinda Terry), Stacy Harris (as John Glixton), Earl Holliman (as Dan Samuels), Robert Loggia (as Lt. Carlos Moreno), Darren McGavin (as Jeb Powell), Ralph Meeker (as Kermit Teller), Mary Ann Mobley (as Ann L'Andry), Agnes Moorehead (as Watoma), Edward Mulhare (as Col. Sean Redmond), Kathleen Nolan (as Nora Moffett), Larry Pennell (as Chief Yellow Hawk), Paul Petersen (as Lieutenant Cox), Donnelly Rhodes (as War Cloud), Chris Robinson (as Lt. Tim Rudford), Ned Romero (as Running Feet), Barbara Rush (as Brigid O'Rourke), Albert Salmi (as Capt. John Mark Charrington), William Smith (as Chief Tall Knife), Dub Taylor (as Trader), Ray Walston (as Ned Quimbo), James Whitmore (as Eldo), Terry Wilson (as Brownsmith), and William Windom (as Clark Samson). In the last episode entitled "The Raiders", Custer enlists the aid of Kiowa Indians to help him to locate the parties responsible for a series of wagon train raids.

Maunder was twenty-eight when he was cast as the 28-year-old Custer. The show was canceled due to poor reviews and protests by Native American tribes throughout the United States.

Two episodes, No. 1 and No. 6, were later combined and released as a feature length film, entitled "Crazy Horse and Custer, The Untold Story".  On June 7, 2016, Custer: The Complete Series (Collector's Edition) was released on dvd by Shout! Factory.

Episodes

References

External links 
 

1960s Western (genre) television series
1967 American television series debuts
1967 American television series endings
American Broadcasting Company original programming
Cultural depictions of George Armstrong Custer
Cultural depictions of Crazy Horse
Television shows set in Kansas
Television series by 20th Century Fox Television